Tomasz Szewczak (born June 13, 1977 in Olsztyn) is a Polish Ju-Jitsu fighter.

Career
Tomasz won a silver medal at the 2013 World Games in the Ju-Jitsu 94 kg Men event.

In the following World Games, he won a gold and a bronze medal in Wrocław, Poland.

References

1977 births
Living people
Polish practitioners of Brazilian jiu-jitsu
Sportspeople from Olsztyn
World Games gold medalists
World Games silver medalists
World Games bronze medalists
Competitors at the 2013 World Games
Competitors at the 2017 World Games